Jean-Baptiste Gourion, O.S.B.Oliv. (24 October 1934 – 23 June 2005) was a French Catholic Benedictine monk and auxiliary bishop from 2003 until his death in 2005.

Biography
Gourion was born in 1934 in Oran, Algeria, to a Jewish family, when Algeria was a French colony. When studying medicine in France, he decided to enlist in French Army during the Algerian War.
 
Gourion converted from Judaism to the Catholic Church in 1958. In 1961, he entered a Benedictine Monastery, and in 1967, he was ordained a priest.
Father Gourion came to Israel in 1976 with two other monks in order to rebuild the old monastery in Abu Gosh and in 1999 was named its abbot.

In 2003, Gourion was nominated Auxiliary Bishop of the Latin Patriarchate of Jerusalem by Pope John Paul II. In the same year he was also appointed to the titular see of Lydda. His mission notably included care of Hebrew Catholics' spiritual necessities.  
He died on 23 June 2005.

References

1934 births
2005 deaths
Converts to Roman Catholicism from Judaism
Algerian Jews
French Roman Catholic priests
French Benedictines
Benedictine bishops
French Army soldiers
People of the Algerian War
Israeli people of Algerian-Jewish descent
20th-century Roman Catholic bishops in Israel